Corbek is a small river of Schleswig-Holstein, Germany. It flows into the Bille near Witzhave.

See also
List of rivers of Schleswig-Holstein

Rivers of Schleswig-Holstein
Rivers of Germany